Puteanus may refer to:

Pierre Dupuy (scholar), otherwise known as Puteanus (1582 - 1651), a French scholar, the son of the humanist and bibliophile Claude Dupuy
Erycius Puteanus (1574 - 1646), a humanist and philologist from the Low Countries